Ateybeh (also Romanized as ‘Aţeybeh and ‘Atībeh; also known as Atiyeh) is a village in Shabankareh Rural District, Shabankareh District, Dashtestan County, Bushehr Province, Iran. At the 2011 census, its population was 533, in 130 families.

References 

Populated places in Dashtestan County